Joint Force Headquarters National Capital Region (JFHQ-NCR) is directly responsible for the homeland security and defense of the Washington D.C. area as well as surrounding counties in Virginia and Maryland. Primarily made up of joint military units within the National Capital Region, the JFHQ-NCR assists federal and local civilian agencies and disaster response teams in the event that the capital area's security is or possibly could be breached by acts of terrorism.
Officially activated on September 22, 2004, JFHQ-NCR is part of United States Northern Command.

History

After the terrorist attacks on the World Trade Center and The Pentagon on September 11, 2001, military and civilian leaders recognized a need for strong cooperation and communication between agencies and national and local units in times of emergency or to prevent such attacks in the first place, something that had been severely lacking prior to that time.  USNORTHCOM was subsequently established, taking the lead of several JTFs throughout the U.S. that are subordinate to the Command and charged with homeland security.  The Joint Force Headquarters for the National Capital Region was created for the sole purpose of preventing and responding to future terrorist attacks within the Washington, D.C. area and its surrounding cities and counties.

JFHQ-NCR officially came into being in September 2004.  However, the unit had been operating in part for at least a year prior to its official creation.  Major General James T. Jackson, the Military District of Washington (MDW) Commander at the time of the September 11th attacks, was the first to take hold of the concept of the new Headquarters and began to piece various aspects of it together, particularly seeing and responding to the need for a mobile command center and a more effective central command and control headquarters.  When MG Galen B. Jackman replaced Jackson in 2003, Jackman solidified the role of JFHQ, commanding the response to various regional emergencies and National Special Security Events (NSSE), proving the potential of JFHQ-NCR.  When the organization finally stood up in the fall of 2004—after having had a year of practice—it was fully operational and able to provide an effective answer to the NCR's growing security concerns.

JFHQ-NCR in action

When called upon to assist in a regional crisis or an NSSE (national events requiring security measures outlined and directed by the U.S. Secret Service), the JFHQ mobilizes and becomes Joint Task Force-National Capital Region (JTF-NCR).  The JTF-NCR is then directed to respond as quickly as possible and with as many component partners as applicable to address the issue at hand.  Although the JFHQ is the single point of contact for entities within the JTF-NCR, the JTF is ultimately guided by the lead agency (the agency that asked JFHQ for assistance to begin with) and the directives of USNORTHCOM.

The JFHQ-NCR has had several claims of success in the few years it has been operating.  The first crisis that required the help of the JFHQ's JTF occurred on February 2, 2004 when ricin was discovered in the Capitol Hill office mail room of Senate Majority Leader Bill Frist.  The Marine Corps' Chemical Biological Incident Response Force (CBIRF) assisted in the situation and helped officials safely decontaminate the area.

Other JTFs have been activated in the NCR for the dedication of the World War II Memorial on the National Mall and its accompanying World War II reunion, former president Ronald Reagan's state funeral, President George W. Bush's 2005 Presidential Inauguration, President Bush's State of the Union Addresses, and most recently the state funeral of former president Gerald Ford.

Joint Operations Center

The Joint Operations Center (JOC), dedicated a month and a half prior to the official activation of the JFHQ, is the command and control center at the heart of the JFHQ. The JOC is housed in a newly renovated building at Ft. McNair, designed with the latest in technological advances for its time.  The JOC boasts 50+ work stations, complete with secure and non-secure capability by way of phones, computer network access, and video teleconferencing for the entire center.  The JOC is also "red phone" capable, Geospatial Information System ready, and fully integrated into the secure NORTHCOM communications system.  In addition to the ability to communicate with various civilian and military units within the NCR, satellites provide the JOC with secure communication links to the Mobile Command Center and its smaller mobile cousin, "Dagger."

Mobile Command Post

The Mobile Command Post (MCP), like the JOC, was instituted as a direct result of failures in communication capabilities at the time of the September 11th attacks.  MG James Jackson needed to be in two places at once much of the time to coordinate recovery efforts at the Pentagon; however, "We had no vehicle then that was capable of anything more than a non-secure telephone connection.  The EOC was basically an unclassified environment. (Jackson) made the commitment to secure a modern mobile command center and to fund it from the MDW budget," said Col. Egon Hawrylak (USA-Ret.), a civilian deputy operations officer who previously worked in the MDW operations center.

The MCP, the mobile, smaller version the JOC, is situated on a 41-foot, 10-wheeled, truck chassis.  The MCP was custom built for its mission of providing mobile support to the JFHQ commander and the JOC and, like the JOC, is complete with the latest in computer, technological, and communication advances.

Joint Service Honor Guard
The Joint Service Honor Guard is composed of personnel from the official honour guard units of each uniformed branch in the United States Armed Forces. The honour guard units of each of the services is located in or near Washington D. C., and form the ad-hoc battalion sized unit to represent the entire armed forces at numerous ceremonies of state, mostly State visits to the United States and the Armed Forces Farewell ceremony to the outgoing President before the United States presidential inauguration in January.

The following units make up the battalion:

 Echo Company, 4th Battalion, 3rd U.S. Infantry Regiment (The Old Guard) 
 Ceremonial Company A, Marine Barracks Washington
 United States Navy Ceremonial Guard
 United States Air Force Honor Guard
 United States Coast Guard Ceremonial Honor Guard

Since the early 1940s, the 3rd United States Infantry Regiment (The Old Guard) has served as the official escort to the President, additionally providing security for the National Capital Region during national/local emergencies.

Operationally attached to the ad-hoc battalion are five of the military bands and two field music formations designated as premier ensembles of the entire Armed Forces:

 United States Marine Band
 United States Marine Drum and Bugle Corps
 United States Navy Band
 The United States Army Band
 Old Guard Fife and Drum Corps
 United States Air Force Band
 United States Coast Guard Band

These bands take turns whenever they are assigned to perform in state ceremonies with the exception of the USMDBC, given that it reports directly to the office of the Commandant of the Marine Corps, can only be assigned on similar events upon his discretion. The 257th Army Band of the District of Columbia National Guard is occasionally attached if any of the bands are absent.

Organization

Command of the JFHQ-NCR

The commanding officer of the JFHQ-NCR is also the Commanding General of the Army's MDW.  This general officer, who represents the US Army within JFHQ-NCR through the MDW, is aided by a deputy commanding officer who is not associated with the MDW; he or she is a commanding officer of one of the military component-partners within JFHQ-NCR.  The commander of JFHQ-NCR, like all JTFs in the U.S., must answer to USNORTHCOM and its commanding general.

The Command Sergeant Major of the MDW, Command Sergeant Major Franklin Velez, fills the same position within the JFHQ-NCR.  Because of the double-role of the MDW/JFHQ-NCR Commander, both commands are headquartered out of the same address at Fort Lesley J. McNair, Washington, D.C.

Interagency and community cooperation
When called upon for assistance by the civilian sector of the National Capital Region, the JFHQ-directed-JTF acts as a single cooperative point of contact for a wide range of military units, civilian units, and government agencies throughout the Washington, D.C. area.

Military units and assets
Army Military District of Washington/Joint Force Land Component Commander (JFLCC) (MDW)
White House Transportation Agency
1st Battalion, 3rd U.S. Infantry Regiment
United States Army Band
911th Engineer Company
12th Aviation Battalion
 Washington Military Police Battalion (CID), Fort Myer, Virginia
 68th Military Police Detachment (CID), Fort Meade, Maryland
 75th Military Police Detachment (CID), Fort Belvoir, Virginia
Site-R Raven Rock Mountain Complex Alternate Joint Communications Center (AJCC) Alternate National Military Command Center
Naval District Washington (NDW)/Joint Force Maritime Component Commander (JFMCC)
Air Force District of Washington (AFDW)/Joint Force Air Component Commander (JFACC)
Marine Corps National Capital Region Command (MCNCRC)
U.S. Coast Guard Fifth District

On 10 June 2010, Secretary of the Army, John M. McHugh, rescinded MDW's responsibility for the administration and daily operation of Arlington National Cemetery. However, MDW still maintains ceremonial support for funerals and guarding the Tomb of the Unknown Soldier.

When the Joint Forces Headquarters transitions to become Joint Task Force National Capital Region, the 320th Air Expeditionary Wing activates and becomes the Air Force service component of the task force.  Normally, the commander of the Air Force District of Washington serves as the commander of the wing.

Military installations
Fort McNair, Washington, D.C.
Joint Base Myer-Henderson Hall, Virginia
Fort Belvoir, Virginia
Fort A.P. Hill, Virginia
Fort Meade, Maryland

Government/intelligence agencies
USNORTHCOM
Department of Homeland Security's Office of National Capitol Region Coordination (ONCRC)
Federal Bureau of Investigation (FBI)
Joint Terrorism Task Force (JTTF)
Naval Criminal Investigative Service's Multiple Threat Alert Center (MTAC)
902nd Military Intelligence Brigade
Federal Emergency Management Agency (FEMA)
U.S. Secret Service
Federal Aviation Administration
U.S. Department of Health and Human Services
Joint Task Force Civil Support (JTF-CS)
White House Military Office
D.C./Virginia/Maryland State and National Guard Units
US Army's Installation Management Agency, Northeast Region Office (IMA-NERO)
Washington Metropolitan Area Transit Authority
Washington Headquarters Services
Pentagon Force Protection Agency
Walter Reed Army Medical Center
National Naval Medical Center

Civilian units
U.S. Park Police
U.S. Capitol Police
Metropolitan Police Department of the District of Columbia
D.C. Homeland Security Emergency Management Agency (HSEMA)
Local fire departments
Local police departments
Search and Rescue (SAR) units

References

External links

Military in Washington, D.C.
Joint military units and formations of the United States